Afrosciadium natalense is a member of the carrot family, Apiaceae. It is a perennial tuberous herb, endemic to the KwaZulu-Natal province of South Africa.

Afrosciadium natalense was previously classified as Peucedanum natalense before the genus Afrosciadium was established in 2008.

References

Apioideae
Endemic flora of South Africa
Plants described in 2008